Atom on Sphere is a Japanese supergroup formed in 2011, combining rock and electronic music. They first performed as a special guest at an event organized and headlined by guitarist Shigeo's band The Samos on October 8, 2011 at Shibuya WWW. Their eponymous debut album was released on December 21, 2011, and performed live at an all-night record release party at Daikanyama Unit in Tokyo on December 23, 2011. All lyrics are in English.

Members
 Ken Lloyd (Fake?, Oblivion Dust) – vocals
 Shigeo (The Samos, ex. SBK) – guitar, programming, backing vocals
  (Dragon Ash) – drums, backing vocals
  (ex. Beat Crusaders) – bass, backing vocals

Discography
Albums
Atom on Sphere (21 December 2011, Nayutawave Records)
The Secret Life of Mine (16 April 2019, INNOVATOR RECORDS)

References

External links
 Official label website 
 Official Facebook

Musical groups established in 2011
Japanese electronic music groups
Japanese alternative rock groups
Trip hop groups
Universal Music Japan artists
Musical groups from Tokyo
2011 establishments in Japan